Taviefe is a town in the Volta Region of Ghana. It is about 15minutes drive East of Ho, the regional capital. It comprises four major sub-towns, namely; Aviefe -Avedome, Avenya, Dzefe, Sreme and Deme. The predominant occupation of the people is agriculture. The towns are blessed with very fertile land and natural sources of water. Aviefe is on the hill and is popularly called "Ohio" due to its high level. Aviefe is also popular with the commercialization of "borbor" a local form of dance. Taviefe is known for the Taviefe Secondary School.  The school is a second cycle institution.

References

Populated places in the Volta Region